Adam Ingram may refer to:
Adam Ingram (Labour politician) (born 1947), Scottish politician
Adam Ingram (SNP politician) (born 1951), Scottish politician